Sea Dragon is a horizontally scrolling shooter for the TRS-80 computer, written by Wayne Westmoreland and Terry Gilman, and released in 1982 by Adventure International. The gameplay is similar to the Scramble arcade game, but underwater. It was ported to the Apple II, Atari 8-bit family, Commodore 64, TRS-80 Color Computer, and DOS.

In 1995, Wayne Westmoreland placed the game into the public domain. In January 2016 the source code for the Atari 8-bit version was released to the public and added to the Internet Archive.

Gameplay

The player controls a submarine that can shoot torpedoes both forwards and upwards. The gameplay involves navigating "past underwater mountains and through labyrinthine passages while avoiding webs of explosive mines that rise from the sea bottom. Additional dangers include mine-dropping ships, enemy attack stations, falling stalactites, and deadly lasers—any of which could keep you from your ultimate goal: destruction of the incredibly powerful nuclear reactor at the end of the undersea course." (Adventure International catalog, 1982)

Speech
The Apple II version uses digitized voice that says "Sea Dragon!" When the user starts the game, he or she is told, "Captain! Your ship's computer is now ready. Please wait while I initialize systems!", and during the game will be informed, "Air level critical!", "Checkpoint!", and "Approaching maximum damage!" The use of speech was a novelty, as the Apple II speaker is only able to emit a one-bit click. Programming Sea Dragon to play back an audio sample is a technical achievement shared with Castle Wolfenstein (1981), Dung Beetles (1982), Creepy Corridors (1982), and Plasmania (1982).

The Color Computer version is the only other version that includes speech. It says "Welcome aboard, Captain!" on the title screen.

Reception

Writing for Video magazine in 1983, Ivan Berger noted that Sea Dragons graphics were dominated by "simple patterns and primary colors". This Berger contrasted with the "more subtle colors and shadings that go into professional animation", however Berger noted that while Sea Dragon was emblematic in this regard, the chromatic and graphical simplicity of the game was endemic to the home computer game medium.

References

External links
Sea Dragon at TRS-80.org
Sea Dragon at Atari Mania
Video TRS-80 gameplay

1982 video games
Adventure International games
Apple II games
Atari 8-bit family games
Commodore 64 games
Commercial video games with freely available source code
DOS games
Horizontally scrolling shooters
Public-domain software with source code
TRS-80 games
TRS-80 Color Computer games
Video games developed in the United States
Video games with underwater settings
Submarines in fiction